Concerto Maximo is a live album by the British progressive rock band Pendragon, released in 2009, recorded in Katowice, on October 13, 2008. It was filmed and edited by Metal Mind. It was released in several versions - a 2 CD release, featuring just the audio from the show, a DVD, featuring the full show, and a DVD and 2 CD special edition, which was limited to 1000 copies.

Track listing
These track lengths are from the CD version of the album. Several of the tracks were shortened or changed; The Walls Of Babylon did not feature the slow introduction, The Wishing Well did not include the first part, "For Your Journey", and The Voyager started from the first riff. A few songs are lengthened, including Nostradamus, in which the band was introduced, and the guitar solo and finale was extended for Masters Of Illusion.

CD 1
 "The Walls Of Babylon" - 5:05
 "A Man Of Nomadic Traits" - 11:32
 "The Wishing Well" - 17:41
 "Eraserhead" - 8:40
 "Total Recall" - 5:56
 "Nostradamus" - 5:31
 "Learning Curve" - 7:19
 "Breaking The Spell" - 8:30
 "Sister Bluebird" - 7:54

CD 2
 "The Shadow" - 9:07
 "The Freak Show" - 4:11
 "The Voyager" - 11:05
 "It's Only Me" - 8:00
 "Masters Of Illusion" - 12:45
 "The King Of The Castle" - 4:53
 "And We'll Go Hunting Deer" - 5:11
 "Queen Of Hearts" - 19:55

Pendragon (band) albums
2009 live albums
2009 video albums
Live video albums